The AAA Fusión Championship ("Campeonato AAA Fusión" in Spanish) was a professional wrestling championship promoted by the AAA promotion in Mexico. The first champion was crowned on March 17, 2013, when Fénix won a tournament for the title. On August 17, 2014, the title was unified with the AAA Cruiserweight Championship.

The championship was generally contested in professional wrestling matches, in which participants execute scripted finishes rather than contend in direct competition.

History
In late 2012, AAA introduced a new television program, titled AAA Fusión, which would start airing alongside the promotion's primary television program, Sin Límite. The first show was taped on September 30, 2012. The following November, AAA started a tournament to determine the inaugural AAA Fusión Champion. On April 23, 2013, AAA split its entire roster into two brands; AAA Evolución and AAA Fusión, with the AAA Fusión Championship becoming exclusive to the latter. On June 27, 2014, AAA announced that the AAA Fusión Championship and the AAA Cruiserweight Championship would be unified on August 17 at Triplemanía XXII. El Hijo del Fantasma won the ten-way elimination match to unify the two titles into the new "AAA World Cruiserweight Championship".

Championship tournament
The AAA Fusión Championship tournament started on November 3, 2012, when Fénix defeated Dark Dragon, Drago and Toscano in a four-way elimination match to become the first wrestler to advance to the finals. The second tournament match took place on November 18, when Daga defeated Jack Evans, Joe Líder and Psicosis in another four-way elimination match. The final two first round elimination matches took place on March 1, 2013, when Juventud Guerrera defeated Aero Star, Pentagón Jr. (Dark Dragon's second appearance in the tournament) and Último Gladiador, while Crazy Boy defeated Angélico, Halloween and Super Fly. The finals of the tournament took place on March 17 at Rey de Reyes, where Fénix defeated Crazy Boy, Daga and Juventud Guerrera to become the inaugural champion.

Title history

References

External links
AAA's official title history

Lucha Libre AAA Worldwide championships
Television wrestling championships